Bangladesh Economic Association is an association of professional economists in Bangladesh. The association has more than 4000 members.

History
The Bangladesh Economic Association established the Dhaka School of Economics in February 2012.

In 2017, Abul Barakat was elected president of the association and Jamaluddin Ahmed was elected its general secretary. It is a member of the International Economic Association.

References

Organisations based in Dhaka
Economics societies
Labour relations in Bangladesh
Research institutes in Bangladesh
Professional associations based in Bangladesh